Puffa Puffa Rice was a brand of breakfast cereal produced by the Kellogg Company. Somewhere between Puffed Wheat and Rice Krispies, the product was a form of puffed rice with a sweet, smooth texture and flavoured with brown sugar. Puffa Puffa Rice was introduced in 1967 marketed with a Hawaiian theme and the product shown arriving on a surfboard. In 1972 the box was re-designed to feature a toy steam locomotive. In 1973 it changed again to feature popular puppet character Sooty waving a magician's wand over the cereal. In the US Puffa Puffa Rice was abruptly phased out during 1975. 

Puffa Puffa Rice figures prominently in Alan Ayckbourn's play Table Manners, which is part of his Norman Conquests.

References

External links
Kellogg Company History
Puffa Puffa Rice memorial page

Kellogg's cereals
1967 establishments in the United States
1975 disestablishments in the United States